Keston Julien (born 26 October 1998) is a Trinidadian footballer who plays as a left-back for Sheriff Tiraspol.

Career

AS Trenčín
Julien made his Fortuna Liga debut for AS Trenčín against Slovan Bratislava on 25 February 2017.

On 17 August 2020, Julien signed for the Transnistrian Divizia Națională club Sheriff Tiraspol.

Career statistics

International

References

External links
 AS Trenčín official club profile
 
 Futbalnet Profile

1998 births
Living people
Trinidad and Tobago footballers
Trinidad and Tobago international footballers
Trinidad and Tobago expatriate footballers
TT Pro League players
Association football defenders
W Connection F.C. players
AS Trenčín players
FC Sheriff Tiraspol players
Slovak Super Liga players
Moldovan Super Liga players
Expatriate footballers in Slovakia
Trinidad and Tobago expatriate sportspeople in Slovakia
Expatriate footballers in Moldova
Trinidad and Tobago expatriate sportspeople in Moldova
Sportspeople from Port of Spain